The Poison of Polygamy is a novel written in Literary Chinese and first published in serial form in the Chinese Times in Melbourne, Australia, between June 1909 and December 1910. It was the first novel by a Chinese diaspora writer to be published in Australia, and the first Chinese-language novel to be published in Australia and possibly in the West. On first publication the author was identified by the alias Jiangxiaerlang. Subsequent research has identified the writer as Wong Shee Ping, a newspaper editor, Christian preacher and republican revolutionary also known as Wong Yau Kung.

Plot 
The novel opens in the Qing dynasty in the 1850s during the Victorian gold rush. The main character, Huang Shangkang, lives in a village in Guangdong province with his wife Ma and is addicted to opium. He and Ma have been married for three years, have no children, and are struggling to pay Shangkang's debts. When Shangkang's mother becomes ill, Ma pawns her few possessions to pay for doctors, but their remedies do not work and the old woman dies. The couple descend further into poverty until they receive a visit from Ma's cousin, who has made his fortune in the Victorian goldrush. The cousin offers to pay for Shangkang's passage to Australia on condition that he give up opium. Shangkang agrees and departs for Victoria.

The novel describes the voyage from Hong Kong to Victoria via South Australia, life on the Victorian goldfields and in Melbourne's Chinatown, and events back in Guangdong, where Ma waits for news of Shangkang. Although set during the second half of the 19th century, the story was written during the first decade of the Australian Federation and just before the end of the Qing Dynasty. It also describes interactions between Chinese Australians and Aboriginal Australians, European colonists, and the Australian bush, and commentary on the status of women in Chinese society.

Publication and translation history 
The novel, written in Literary Chinese, was first published in 53 instalments in the Chinese Times newspaper in Melbourne, between 5 June 1909 and 10 December 1910. Each installment was accompanied by an illustration of a young boy holding up a mirror to the Chinese character for "Society". Its author Wong Shee Ping was an editor of the newspaper. It was rediscovered by historian Mei-fen Kuo while she was researching early Chinese-Australian newspapers.

The first English translation of the novel, by Ely Finch, was published by Sydney University Press in 2019 in a bilingual parallel edition with historical commentary by Mei-fen Kuo and Michael Williams.

In 2022 the novel was adapted for the stage by playwright Anchuli Felicia King for a joint 2023 production by La Boite Theatre in Brisbane and the Sydney Theatre Company.

References

1909 in Australia
1909 Australian novels
1910 in Australia
20th-century Chinese novels
Australian literature
Chinese Australian
Chinese-Australian culture
Chinese-Australian history
Novels first published in serial form
Novels set in Guangdong
Novels set in Melbourne